Harum Scarum (released in the United Kingdom as Harem Holiday) is a 1965 American musical comedy film starring Elvis Presley. It was shot on the original Cecil B. DeMille set from the film The King of Kings, with additional footage shot on location at the Iverson Movie Ranch in Chatsworth, Los Angeles. Some of the film was based on Rudolph Valentino's 1921 movie The Sheik. 

The film reached #11 on the Variety national weekly box office chart, earned $2 million at the box office, and finished #40 on the year end list of the top-grossing films of 1965. The film is listed in Golden Raspberry Award founder John Wilson's book The Official Razzie Movie Guide as one of The 100 Most Enjoyably Bad Movies Ever Made.

Synopsis
American movie star Johnny Tyrone goes to the Middle East to premiere his new picture. He is seduced by the lovely Aishah, then kidnapped by a man named Sinan who wants Johnny to help him kill the king in the fictional town of Bar Esalaam. Johnny escapes the palace with the help of a slave girl, Shalimar. Once out of the palace walls, Johnny tells her that he was brought to the Middle East to assassinate the king, which causes Shalimar to run off in fear as she is actually the king's daughter.

Johnny meets up with his fellow escapee Zacha and makes a plan to foil the assassination plot by joining a troupe of musicians who will be going to entertain the people of Bar Esalaam on the last day of Ramadan. Johnny successfully befriends the troupe, but that night they are ambushed by Aishah and her men after being betrayed by Zacha. Aishah orders Johnny to go through with the assassination after threatening the lives of the musicians and their children. Meanwhile, Princess Shalimar can not shake the feelings she has for Johnny. On the day of the festivities Johnny reluctantly moves in to kill the King but is thwarted by Shalimar. Johnny, the musicians and the kids are sentenced to death.

The troupe is spared death after they are rescued by their associate, a dwarf named Baba. Johnny breaks into the King's room and convinces him that he was blackmailed into the plot by Sinan and also confesses his love for Shalimar. The King believes Johnny and helps him infiltrate Sinan's lair where it is revealed that the man who orchestrated the assassination plot was none other than the King's brother Prince Dragna. Johnny manages to overpower Sinan but learns that his army has grown in number and taken the town by force.

Johnny, The King, Shalimar, the musicians and the remorseful Zacha gather as many of the King's most loyal servants to battle the assassins and take back the town while the King enters Dragna's hideout vowing revenge. However it is revealed that rather than kill Dragna he has chosen to banish him after besting him in a game of chess. Johnny asks the King not to banish him to the United States. With order restored, Johnny and his new royal bride honeymoon in Las Vegas, along with a few of her dancing girls.

Primary cast
 Elvis Presley as Johnny Tyronne
 Mary Ann Mobley as Princess Shalimar
 Fran Jeffries as Aishah
 Michael Ansara as Prince Dragna
 Jay Novello as Zacha
 Philip Reed as King Toranshah
 Theo Marcuse as Sinan
 Billy Barty as Baba
 Dirk Harvey as Mokar
 Jack Costanzo as Julna
 Larry Chance as Captain Herat
 Barbara Werle as Leilah
 Brenda Benet as Emerald
 Gail Gilmore as Sapphire
 Wilda Taylor as Amethyst
 Vicki Malkin as Sari
 Ryck Rydon as Mustapha
 Joey Russo as Yussef

Production
Upon hearing about the movie for the first time, Elvis loved the idea of his character as being similar to a sheik. Eventually, he grew tired of the film because his character was made to look like a fool.

Similar to Elvis' misconception of the script, Colonel Tom Parker thought the film was a comedy and suggested introducing a talking camel.

Home media
Harum Scarum was released to DVD by Warner Home Video on August 7, 2007, as a Region 1 widescreen DVD.

Soundtrack

Reception
Vincent Canby of The New York Times wrote in a negative review that Presley walked through the film "with all the animation of a man under deep sedation, but then he had read the script". Variety wrote that the picture "suffers from a lack of imagination" in providing Presley with a "substantial showcase", but that the eight song numbers in the film would "probably meet with response similar to Presley's past entries". Margaret Harford of the Los Angeles Times wrote, "Nobody, least of all Elvis, can bring parody to heel in this effort from MGM, directed by Gene Nelson. Presley isn't Bob Hope and Mary Ann Mobley, beauty winner though she is, won't pass for Dorothy Lamour. Put them together and you realize right off that Harum Scarum isn't going to be much fun." Jack Shaheen listed Harum Scarum in his "Worst List" of films with anti-Arab stereotypes.

See also
List of American films of 1965

References

External links
 Interview with Mary Ann Mobley
 
 Comprehensive review by Chad Plambeck at 3-B Theater
 Review by J. Bannerman at Stomp Tokyo, 2003
 Review by Mark Zimmer at digitallyOBSESSED!, August 1, 2004
Review by Dennis Prince at DVD Verdict, July 30, 2004
Harum Scarum at the Iverson Movie Ranch
Filming the original version of the Harum Scarum tent scene on the Iverson Movie Ranch
 Iverson Movie Ranch: History, vintage photos.

1965 films
1965 musical comedy films
American musical comedy films
Metro-Goldwyn-Mayer films
Films about actors
Films directed by Gene Nelson
1960s English-language films
1960s American films